Futuristic Mob is a collaboration album between American rappers The Jacka and DuBBleOO. It includes guest appearances from J. Stalin and E-40, among other artists.

Music videos have been filmed for "100 100's" featuring T Wayne, "Time Standing Still" featuring J. Stalin, "Wallet So Fat" and "My Dreams".

Track listing

References

External links
 AllMusic review

Collaborative albums
2013 albums
The Jacka albums